Alec Olney (4 January 1922 – 25 April 2017) was a British long-distance runner who competed in the 1948 Summer Olympics. He was born in Hampstead.

References

External links
 

1922 births
2017 deaths
Olympic athletes of Great Britain
Athletes (track and field) at the 1948 Summer Olympics
People from Hampstead
Athletes from London
English male long-distance runners
Members of Thames Valley Harriers